Emre Güral (born 5 April 1989) is a professional footballer who plays as a forward. Born in Germany, he represented Turkey at 'A2' international level.

Club career
On 29 March 2022, Güral joined Italian Serie B club Crotone until the end of the season.

References

External links
 
 
 
 

1989 births
Sportspeople from Offenbach am Main
Footballers from Hesse
Living people
Turkish footballers
Turkey B international footballers
Association football forwards
German footballers
German people of Turkish descent
Eintracht Frankfurt players
SpVgg Greuther Fürth players
SSV Jahn Regensburg players
SV Elversberg players
Bucaspor footballers
Trabzonspor footballers
Eskişehirspor footballers
Antalyaspor footballers
Alanyaspor footballers
Türkgücü München players
MKE Ankaragücü footballers
F.C. Crotone players
3. Liga players
Regionalliga players
TFF First League players
Süper Lig players
Serie B players
Turkish expatriate footballers
German expatriate footballers
Turkish expatriate sportspeople in Italy
German expatriate sportspeople in Italy
Expatriate footballers in Italy